Chamaepentas is a genus of flowering plants in the family Rubiaceae. It is native to tropical Africa.

Species
Chamaepentas graniticola (E.A.Bruce) Kårehed & B.Bremer - Tanzania
Chamaepentas greenwayi Bremek. -  Tanzania
Chamaepentas hindsioides (K.Schum.) Kårehed & B.Bremer - Tanzania, Kenya
Chamaepentas hindsioides var. glabrescens (Verdc.) Kårehed & B.Bremer - Tanzania, Kenya
Chamaepentas hindsioides var. hindsioides - Tanzania, Kenya
Chamaepentas hindsioides var. parensis (Verdc.) Kårehed & B.Bremer  - Tanzania
Chamaepentas hindsioides var. williamsii (Verdc.) Kårehed & B.Bremer  - Tanzania
Chamaepentas longituba (K.Schum.) Kårehed & B.Bremer  - Tanzania
Chamaepentas nobilis (S.Moore) Kårehed & B.Bremer - Tanzania, Zimbabwe, Zambia, Democratic Republic of the Congo
Chamaepentas pseudomagnifica (M.Taylor) Kårehed & B.Bremer - Kenya, Malawi, Tanzania

References

External links
Kew World Checklist of Selected Plant Families, Chamaepentas

Rubiaceae genera
Knoxieae